Bonaventura Engelbertz van Oldenzeel (died 1539) was a Roman Catholic prelate who served as Auxiliary Bishop of Utrecht (1538–1539).

Biography
Bonaventura Engelbertz van Oldenzeel was ordained a priest in the Order of Friars Minor. On 30 Oct 1538, he was appointed during the papacy of Pope Paul III as Auxiliary Bishop of Utrecht and Titular Bishop of Hebron. in Nov 1538, he was consecrated bishop by George van Egmond, Bishop of Utrecht. He served as Auxiliary Bishop of Utrecht until his death in 1539.

References 

16th-century Roman Catholic bishops in the Holy Roman Empire
Bishops appointed by Pope Paul III
1539 deaths
Franciscan bishops